These are the matches of CSKA Moscow playing in Europe.

Overall

Results in European competitions

Result by team

Notes and references

External links 

 Official website
 Fans site CSKA
 Peski

Europe
Russian football clubs in international competitions